Sergei Mikhailovich Kurzanov (Сергей Михайлович Курзанов, born 1947) is a Russian (formerly Soviet) paleontologist at the Paleontological Institute of the Russian Academy of Sciences. He is known mainly for his work in Mongolia and the ex-Soviet republics in Central Asia.  In 1976 he announced the discovery of Alioramus.  In 1981 he announced the discovery of Avimimus.

In 1998 a species of iguanodont dinosaur  from Mongolia was named Altirhinus kurzanovi in his honor.

References

Living people
1947 births
Russian paleontologists
Soviet paleontologists